Ingrid Cristina Ramos Ortiz (born 13 March 1991) is a Salvadoran footballer who plays as a forward for El Salvador women's national team.

Early life
Ramos was born in La Paz Department.

International career
Ramos capped for El Salvador at senior level during two CONCACAF Women's Championship qualifications (2010 and 2018) and two CONCACAF Women's Olympic Qualifying Championship qualifications (2012 and 2020).

See also
List of El Salvador women's international footballers

References

1991 births
Living people
People from La Paz Department (El Salvador)
Salvadoran women's footballers
Women's association football forwards
El Salvador women's international footballers